Palmyra is a town in Somerset County, Maine, United States. The population was 1,924 at the 2020 census.

History
Palmyra was incorporated in 1807.

Geography

Demographics

2010 census
As of the census of 2010, there were 1,986 people, 809 households, and 552 families living in the town. The racial makeup of the town was 97.7% White, 0.2% African American, 0.6% Native American, 0.2% Asian, and 1.3% from two or more races. Hispanic or Latino of any race were 0.2% of the population.

There were 809 households, of which 27.6% had children under the age of 18 living with them, 53.3% were married couples living together, 10.5% had a female householder with no husband present, 4.4% had a male householder with no wife present, and 31.8% were non-families. 23.4% of all households were made up of individuals, and 10.6% had someone living alone who was 65 years of age or older. The average household size was 2.45 and the average family size was 2.87.

The median age in the town was 43.9 years. 21% of residents were under the age of 18; 6.8% were between the ages of 18 and 24; 24.1% were from 25 to 44; 30.5% were from 45 to 64; and 17.7% were 65 years of age or older. The gender makeup of the town was 49.2% male and 50.8% female.

2000 census
As of the census of 2000, there were 1,953 people, 768 households, and 543 families living in the town. There were 851 housing units at an average density of 21.2 per square mile (8.2/km). The racial makeup of the town was 98.52% White, 0.26% Native American, 0.36% Asian, 0.10% from other races, and 0.77% from two or more races. Hispanic or Latino of any race were 0.31% of the population.

There were 768 households, out of which 30.6% had children under the age of 18 living with them, 59.8% were married couples living together, 5.9% had a female householder with no husband present, and 29.2% were non-families. 23.3% of all households were made up of individuals, and 10.7% had someone living alone who was 65 years of age or older.  The average household size was 2.54 and the average family size was 2.98.

In the town, the population was spread out, with 25.4% under the age of 18, 6.9% from 18 to 24, 27.3% from 25 to 44, 25.7% from 45 to 64, and 14.7% who were 65 years of age or older.  The median age was 39 years. For every 100 females, there were 97.5 males.  For every 100 females age 18 and over, there were 93.0 males.

The median income for a household in the town was $31,287, and the median income for a family was $35,150. Males had a median income of $27,500 versus $19,402 for females. The per capita income for the town was $13,717.  About 12.8% of families and 16.6% of the population were below the poverty line, including 21.8% of those under age 18 and 16.1% of those age 65 or over.

Notable people 

 Dean Cray, Member of the Maine House of Representatives
 Joshua Tardy, Minority Leader, Maine House of Representatives
 James Springer White, co-founder of the Seventh-day Adventist Church and Andrews University

References

Towns in Somerset County, Maine
Towns in Maine